The Faber Book of Modern Verse was a poetry anthology, edited in its first edition by Michael Roberts, and published in 1936 by Faber and Faber. There was a second edition (1951) edited by Anne Ridler, and a third edition (1965) edited by Donald Hall. The selection was of poems in English printed after 1910, which meant that work by Gerard Manley Hopkins could be included. A later edition was edited by Peter Porter.

Poets in the Faber Book of Modern Verse (1965)
Some of the poets in the 1936 edition were not included in the 1965 edition, which also had the addition of a substantial supplement:

Conrad Aiken - W. H. Auden - George Barker - John Berryman - Robert Bly - Hart Crane - E. E. Cummings - Donald Davie - James Dickey - H. D. - Keith Douglas - Richard Eberhart - T. S. Eliot - William Empson - David Gascoyne - W. S. Graham - Robert Graves - Thom Gunn - John Heath-Stubbs - Geoffrey Hill - Gerard Manley Hopkins - Ted Hughes - T. E. Hulme - David Jones - Philip Larkin - D. H. Lawrence - Denise Levertov - C. Day Lewis - Robert Lowell - Norman MacCaig - Hugh MacDiarmid - Louis MacNeice - Charles Madge - W. S. Merwin - Christopher Middleton - Harold Monro - Marianne Moore - Edwin Muir - Howard Nemerov - Charles Olson - Wilfred Owen - Sylvia Plath - Ezra Pound - F. T. Prince - Kathleen Raine - John Crowe Ransom - Herbert Read - Laura Riding - Anne Ridler - Michael Roberts - Theodore Roethke - Isaac Rosenberg - Louis Simpson - Edith Sitwell - W. D. Snodgrass - Stephen Spender - Wallace Stevens - Allen Tate - Dylan Thomas - R. S. Thomas - Charles Tomlinson - Vernon Watkins - Richard Wilbur - William Carlos Williams - James Wright - W. B. Yeats

See also
 1936 in poetry
 1951 in poetry
 1965 in poetry
 1936 in literature
 1951 in literature
 1965 in literature
 American poetry
 English poetry
 List of poetry anthologies

References

1936 anthologies
British poetry anthologies
Faber and Faber books